{{DISPLAYTITLE:C15H23NO}}
The molecular formula C15H23NO (molar mass: 233.34 g/mol, exact mass: 233.1780 u) may refer to:

 Faxeladol
 3-MeO-PCE, or 3-Methoxyeticyclidine
 Meptazinol

Molecular formulas